Teaching is the practice implemented by a teacher aimed at transmitting skills (knowledge, know-how, and interpersonal skills) to a learner, a student, or any other audience in the context of an educational institution. Teaching is closely related to learning, the student's activity of appropriating this knowledge.
Teaching is part of the broader concept of education.

Methods

Profession

Training

References